Mary Bridget Duffy is an early pioneer in the creation of hospitalist medicine. She was chosen to be ranked among the "Most Influential Women in Bay Area Business for 2015" by San Francisco Business Times and was named the "2015 Woman of the Year" by Women Health Care Executives.

Biographical information 
Duffy is the chief medical officer (CMO) of Vocera Communications, Inc., which provides integrated, intelligent communication that address critical communication challenges within healthcare and other mission-critical industries.

Prior to her appointment as CMO at Vocera, Duffy co-founded and served as chief executive officer of ExperiaHealth, a company whose mission is to assist organizations in rapidly improving staff and patient loyalty through innovative technologies and solutions that restore the human connection in healthcare. ExperiaHealth was acquired by Vocera Communications and now drives the company's thought leadership and research collaborative as the Experience Innovation Network.

Duffy was an early pioneer in the creation of hospitalist medicine and launched programs to accelerate clinical discovery in the field of integrative and heart-brain medicine, helping establish the Earl and Doris Bakken Heart Brain Institute. She previously served as chief experience officer (CXO) of the Cleveland Clinic – the first senior position of its kind in the nation – leading the institution in improving patient experience as its top strategic priority. She is a frequent speaker on the subject of why patient experience matters and how it impacts clinical outcomes.

Duffy was named a “Women of Influence” by the Silicon Valley Business Journal and one of the “Most Powerful Women in Healthcare IT” by Health Data Management. In 2015, she was named “Woman of the Year” by Women Health Care Executives and selected as one of the “Most Influential Women in Bay Area Business for 2015” by San Francisco Business Times. In 2014, Duffy was recognized as a “Health IT Change Agent” by Health IT Outcomes and named among the “Top 50 in Digital Healthcare” by Rock Health. She also earned the Quantum Leap Award for taking the risk to spur internal change in the field of medicine, and was featured in HealthLeaders magazine as one of “20 People Who Make Healthcare Better.”

Duffy attended medical school at the University of Minnesota, and completed her residency in internal medicine at Abbott Northwestern Hospital in Minneapolis, Minnesota. She currently serves on the advisory boards of Velano Vascular and Maven Clinic, and is on the board of directors for Rock Health and Children's HeartLink.

Publications 
 The Importance of Preventing Physician, Nurse Burnout: Hospitals and Health Networks
 Driving Practice Growth by Restoring Humanity to Healthcare: Physician's Money Digest
 Three Ways to Empower Patients to Improve Health Outcomes: Executive Insight
 The Business Case for Innovating Communications in Healthcare: Fierce Practice Management
 How Healthcare Organizations Drive Loyalty and Growth: Becker's Hospital Review
 Four Steps to Improve the Patient Experience and Heal the Art of Medicine: Engaging the Patient, December 2010

References 

 Healthcare Workers Aim to Perfect Patient Care Experience Across National Capital Region: Health.mil
 Chief Experience Officers Push Patients to Forefront: Managed Care
'Humanizing' Patient Experience: Increasing the Demand for CXOs: Healthcare IT News
 Report: 4 Best Practices to Humanizing Efficiency in Healthcare: HIT Consultant
 Executive Survey Cites Need to 'Humanize' Population Health: HIMSS Future Care
 Combining Empathy, Data Analytics and The Human Story: Health Catalyst
 Patient Experience Officers on the Rise: mHealth News
 Why Healthcare Must Fight Against Doc, Nurse Burnout: Fierce Healthcare
 Improving the Patient Experience is No 'Fluff' Job: 4  CXOs Weigh In: Becker's Hospital Review
 The Importance of Preventing Burnout Among Physicians, Nurses: Hospitals & Health Networks
 CXO Role Gains Steam as Consumers Gain Clout: Healthcare IT News
 Are You Ready for the Evolution from Patient to Consumer?: MGMA Connection Magazine
 Driving Practice Growth by Restoring Humanity to Healthcare: Physician's Money Digest
 Innovative Programs Address Enhancing Patient Experience: Skylight Healthcare, October 2010
 Vocera Adds Three Healthcare Leaders to Board of Directors: Vocera Communications, March 2010
 What President Obama Will Learn at Cleveland Clinic About Healthcare: Fast Company, July 2009

External links 
 BridgetDuffyMD.com
 Vocera Communications

Living people
American health care chief executives
University of Minnesota Medical School alumni
Year of birth missing (living people)